Patrick Pye RHA (1929 – 8 February 2018) was a  sculptor, painter and stained glass artist, resident in County Dublin.

Pye was born in Winchester, England. He died in Dublin, Ireland.

Career
Major commissions can be seen across Ireland. In 1999 a retrospective of his work was exhibited by the Royal Hibernian Academy. He is a founding member of Aosdána.

He has been described as "the most important creative artist in the sphere of religious thought in Ireland in our time".

The poet Michael Longley described the way Pye was treated in the last year of his life as "crass, unforgivably crass".

References

External links
 Patrick Pye's website
 Biographical note at Aosdána
 McAvera B.  "Patrick Pye, Life and Work"  Four Courts Press, Dublin, 2013.
 Fitzsimons R.B. "Arthur O'Leary and Arthur Sullivan, Musical Journeys from Kerry to the heart of Victorian England".  Doghouse, Tralee, 2008

1929 births
2018 deaths
Aosdána members
British male painters
British male sculptors
British stained glass artists and manufacturers
Artists from Dublin (city)
20th-century British painters
20th-century British sculptors
21st-century British painters
20th-century British male artists
21st-century British male artists